The discography of Moments in Grace, an American alternative rock/post-hardcore band, includes one studio album, two extended plays, two singles and one music video. Under its original name, Postcard Audio, the band released an eponymous EP on compact disc in July 2002 through Computer Club Records. The band spent the next year writing its full-length album, Moonlight Survived, but changed name to Moments in Grace in June 2003, shortly before it was recorded.

While still named Postcard Audio, the band attracted the attention of record producer and Atlantic Records A&R representative Brian McTernan, who formed his own Atlantic Records imprint, Salad Days Records, specifically to release the band's music. Moments in Grace was properly introduced with These Days Will Fade, a free digital EP released by Salad Days Records on December 12, 2003, and later re-issued on compact disc by Atlantic Records on March 23, 2004. This was followed by a split 7-inch vinyl single with Funeral for a Friend, co-released by Atlantic Records, Salad Days Records, Mighty Atom Records and Infectious Records on April 20, 2004.

On June 15, 2004, Atlantic Records and Salad Days Records released "Stratus" as a digital and compact disc single. The band filmed a music video for the song two days later, which premiered on August 12, 2004, five days before Moonlight Survived was released. The band's only full-length album, Moonlight Survived, was released after considerable delay on August 17, 2004, on compact disc, double 12-inch vinyl and digitally through Atlantic Records and Salad Days Records.

Albums

Studio albums

Extended plays

Singles

Music videos

Other appearances

References

External links 

 
 
 
 

Discography
Discographies of American artists
Post-hardcore group discographies